Ouri is the stage name of Ourielle Auvé, a French-born Canadian musician whose music blends orchestral composition and electronic music. Her debut album Frame of a Fauna was released in 2021, and was longlisted for the 2022 Polaris Music Prize.

Auvé, a classically trained musician, grew up in France playing harp, cello and piano, and moved to Montreal at age 16 to immerse herself in electronic music.

She released the EPs Superficial in 2017 and We Share Our Blood in 2019, and has collaborated with Helena Deland in the side project Hildegard.

References

21st-century Canadian composers
Canadian electronic musicians
Canadian record producers
Canadian DJs
Canadian women in electronic music
Black Canadian musicians
French emigrants to Canada
Musicians from Montreal
Living people
Year of birth missing (living people)